L’Avenir Illustré was a francophone Jewish periodical published in Casablanca, Morocco from 1926 to 1940. Its editorial line was Zionist and its targeted readership was primarily the Westernized Jewish elite in Morocco, especially francophone graduates of Alliance Israélite Universelle schools. The periodical was founded by Jonathan Thursz (1895–1976), an Ashkenazi Jew from Poland who studied in Belgium and settled in Morocco under the French protectorate.

It was challenged in the Jewish community by L’Union Marocaine and among  by Mohamed El Kholti in L'Action du Peuple.

References 

Jews and Judaism in Casablanca
Newspapers published in Morocco
French-language newspapers published in Morocco
Zionism in Morocco